Pop Rocks is a 2004 American television film starring Gary Cole and Sherilyn Fenn that aired on ABC Family.

Plot 
Bank loan officer Jerry Harden has his life turned upside down when a scruffy-looking guitarist named Izzy shows up at his bank office.  It is revealed that Jerry was a member of a hard rock/glam metal band called Rock Toxin, and the members are planning a one-time-only reunion. Jerry is reluctant, as he prefers suburbia to the wild rock lifestyle he left behind, but is forced to reconsider when he finds that he does not have enough money to send his 17-year-old daughter Olivia to college.

Since Jerry has not told his wife Allison about being in the band, he embarks upon living a hectic double life: nerdish pillar of society by day and heavily-made-up rock singer by night. Since the group Rock Toxin wore heavy "Kiss"-like makeup, he does not think anyone will ever find out about his alternative persona, but this is when his troubles truly begin. Jerry fights to keep his past hidden while taking part in the concert which all the town will be attending.  But only the truth can save his family if it is not too late.

Cast 
 Gary Cole as Jerry "Dagger" Harden
 Sherilyn Fenn as Allison Harden
 David Jensen as Izzy
 Douglas M. Griffin as Stu
 Dane Hereford as Ramone
 Asher Book as Liam Harden
 Johanna Braddy as Olivia Harden
 Joe Inscoe as Carl Hunter
 Shannon Eubanks as Helen Hunter
 Wilbur Fitzgerald as Donaldson
 McKinley Freeman as the TV Host

Production
With the death of ABC Family programming executive Linda Mancuso in December 2003, Disney Channel original programming leaders, executive vice president of original programming and production Gary Marsh and original movies vice president Michael Healy took charge over ABC Family's original movies unit in early 2004. They move away from the planned romantic comedies to green light two telefilms, Crimes of Fashion and Head Rush. By May 10, 2004, Head Rush was renamed Pop Rocks! and had signed its two lead actors, Gary Cole and Sherilyn Fenn. Patricia Clifford was signed on as executive producer and Ron Lagomarsino as director. The movie was filmed in New Orleans.

Reception
Reviewer Phil Gallo of Variety considered the film to have potential but fell "flat" in being humorless and silly.

References

External links 
 

2004 television films
2004 films
ABC Family original films
2004 comedy films
American comedy television films
Films directed by Ron Lagomarsino
2000s English-language films
2000s American films